The Verdant Passage is a fantasy novel based on the Dungeons & Dragons role-playing game and set in the world of the Dark Sun campaign. It was written by Troy Denning and published by TSR in 1991.

Plot summary
A group of heroes, each with their own objectives, work together against the evil sorcerer-king Kalak of Tyr, who is trying to transform himself into a deadly and immortal dragon.

Publication history
In 1991, TSR published a new setting for the Dungeons & Dragons role-playing game, the post-apocalyptic Dark Sun campaign set on the desert world of Athas. As part of the promotional support for the setting, TSR also published a series of five novels set on Athas, beginning with The Verdant Passage, a 341-page mass market paperback written by Troy Denning, with cover art by Brom. It was the first book in Denning's five-part "Prism Pentad":
 The Verdant Passage
 The Crimson Legion (1992)
 The Amber Enchantress (1992)
 The Obsidian Oracle (1993)
 The Cerulean Storm (1993)

Reception
The Verdant Passage was #6 on CBR's 2020 "10 Of The Best DnD Stories To Start Off With" list — the article states that "The reason for this novel's recommendation is more than it just provides a great introduction to the world of Athas. The novel's heroes also provide a great framework for making a party that includes neutral and evil characters."

Other reviews
Amazing Stories, March 1992 (Review by Charles Von Rospach)
Kliatt

References

1991 novels
Dark Sun novels